Bonestan (also Romanized as Bonestān; also known as Nabestān) is a village in Shirkuh Rural District, in the Central District of Taft County, Yazd Province, Iran. At the 2006 census, its population was 10, in 4 families.

References 

Populated places in Taft County